Chytranthus is a genus of flowering plants belonging to the family Sapindaceae.

Its native range is Tropical Africa.

Species:

Chytranthus angustifolius 
Chytranthus atroviolaceus 
Chytranthus calophyllus 
Chytranthus carneus 
Chytranthus cauliflorus 
Chytranthus dasystachys 
Chytranthus dinklagei 
Chytranthus edulis 
Chytranthus ellipticus 
Chytranthus flavoviridis 
Chytranthus gilletii 
Chytranthus imenoensis 
Chytranthus klaineanus 
Chytranthus ledermannii 
Chytranthus longibracteatus 
Chytranthus macrobotrys 
Chytranthus macrophyllus 
Chytranthus mannii 
Chytranthus micranthus 
Chytranthus mortehanii 
Chytranthus obliquinervis 
Chytranthus prieurianus 
Chytranthus punctatus 
Chytranthus setosus 
Chytranthus sexlocularis 
Chytranthus stenophyllus 
Chytranthus strigosus 
Chytranthus subvilliger 
Chytranthus talbotii 
Chytranthus verecundus 
Chytranthus welwitschii 
Chytranthus xanthophyllus

References

Sapindaceae
Sapindaceae genera